Rynin is a lunar impact crater that is located just behind the northwestern limb, on the far side of the Moon. It is located just to the east of the larger crater Stefan, and to the southwest of Chapman.

This is an older lunar crater with an outer rim that has been worn and rounded due to impact erosion. The edge remains relatively well-defined around most of the perimeter, but it is overlain by several smaller craters. Along the eastern side is a long, dagger-shaped gash that cuts through the rim and inner wall to reach the interior floor. This gash is connected to a crater formation just outside the eastern edge of Rynin. A shelf of slumped material runs along the inner wall northward.

The western section of the interior floor of Rynin is occupied by a smaller crater, which stretches from the base of the inner wall to almost the midpoint of Rynin. There are smaller impacts across the otherwise relatively level interior floor, including three along the southern inner wall.

References

 
 
 
 
 
 
 
 
 
 
 
 

Impact craters on the Moon